The Temagami First Nation is located on Bear Island in the heart of Lake Temagami. The island is the second largest in Lake Temagami, after Temagami Island. Its community is known as Bear Island 1. Temagami First Nation (TFN) members are status Indians under the Indian Act that live on and off Bear Island.

The Teme-Augama Anishnabai ("Deep Water by the Shore People") are part of the (Anishinaabe) people, and Bear Island represents only a small portion of the Anishinaabe's Nindakiiminan ("our land"; locally syncoped as Ndakiimnan or "n'daki menan"), which includes over ten thousand square kilometers of land in the area. Some citizens are status Indian (TFN) within the framework of the Indian Act. The majority are not accorded status under the Indian Act, but are still recognized as full community members by the Teme-Augama Anishnabai.

Human occupation 
The Temagami First Nation website states, "The Teme-Augama Anishnabai have utilized the Temagami region of Canada for over 9,000 years."

Scientific evidence of early occupation of the area is sparse. Lake Temagami was free of glacial ice at about 12,150 cal B.P.  There is scientific evidence that the Three Pines site, located at Sand Point on the hub of Lake Temagami near Bear Island, could have been occupied after 7,500 B.P. The Three Pines site includes artifacts similar those found elsewhere that dated to the Archaic Period (7,000-3,000 B.P.).  There is radiocarbon-dated evidence of human occupation 8488 ± 105 cal B.P. 130 km to the west at Fox Lake and 5791 ± 275 cal B.P. to the north east where the Montreal River empties in to Lake Timiskaming.

The reserve 
The reserve is situated on a one square mile Island in the pristine Temagami Wilderness and Bear Island is home to over 200 permanent residents out of a total of over 500 registered members.  Community Days, held in late summer each year, bring back a large part of the full membership as it is an opportunity to renew friendships and family ties and participate in annual Band Council elections.

The Band Council of Temagami First Nation is currently composed of Chief Arnold Paul, Second Chief John Turner, Councillors: Micheal Paul, Wayne Potts, Alice Moore, Jamie Friday, Jamie Saville and Doug Mckenzie Sr.  The council was elected in July 2017 for a 3 year Term.
The island was the 2020 Single Island Search (S.I.S.) winner. The S.I.S. is annual environmental project made by Ben Koser.

History 

The Temagami Indigenous people built homes on Bear Island in the 1880s in addition to homes on their own family lands.  Early chiefs were François Kabimigwune, who was succeeded by his son Ignace Tonené in 1878, who was succeeded by John Paul who died in 1893, leaving Ignace Tonené in power until 1910 when he gave way to his younger brother Frank White Bear.

In 1943, Bear Island was purchased by the Department of Indian Affairs from the Province of Ontario, for the sum of $3,000.00, in order to be designated as a permanent reserve.

The Temagami First Nation refused to accept Bear Island as a reserve until they were denied housing subsidy funds in 1968 until it was agreed, under duress, that Bear Island would become an official Reserve in accordance with the Indian Act of Canada.

Official reserve status was granted in 1971 and the establishment of the Band Office occurred shortly after in the former Department of Lands and Forests building which had been constructed in approximately 1903.

Maple Mountain in Lady Evelyn-Smoothwater Provincial Park is a sacred site of the Temagami First Nation. The Teme-Augama Anishnabai call the mountain Chee-bay-jing, meaning "the place where the spirits go". It is considered the most sacred and powerful place within their realm.

In 1973, Chief Gary Potts of the Temagami Indian Band registered a land caution against The Crown, in Ontario, to stop development on the traditional territory of 10,000 square kilometres, which had been appropriated as Crown land.  The Attorney-General of Ontario pursued legal action against the Band for this caution. While the TAA lost this court case in 1984, the Band proceeded with an appeal to the Supreme Court of Canada where in 1991 it was adjudicated that the Crown had breached its fiduciary obligations to the Temagami Indians and adhered the Band to the 1850 Robinson Huron Treaty.

In 1988, the Ontario Minister of Natural Resources, Vince Kerrio, approved the expansion of the Red Squirrel logging road, directly through disputed territory. This prompted a series of roadblocks by the TAA  in 1988-1989.  Environmentalists and allies provided strong and continued public support.

In 1991, the Wendeban Stewardship Authority was created by the TAA and the Ontario government to manage four townships near the logging road. A land use plan was completed by the authority, however there was no funding nor workers to implement the plan.  In February 1995 the authority started winding down and was replaced with the Temagami Comprehensive Planning Council.

A Draft Settlement Agreement has been developed but a decision to accept the agreement by the community is yet to be determined.

References

External links

Algonquin
First Nations in Ontario
Temagami
Anishinaabe reserves in Ontario